Gatica may refer to:

Gatica (surname)
Gatika, a town in Spain
Gatica, el mono, a 1993 Argentine drama film

See also
Gattaca, a 1997 American science-fiction film